The Campionat Individual de Raspall (Valencian for Raspall Singles Championship) is the Valencian pilota Raspall modality singles league played by professional pilotaris.

Statistics

Campionat Individual de Raspall relevant facts 
 2003: The competition was not played.
 2006: Coeter II is the first mitger who wins a competition that looked to be only for dauers (despite the runners-up Agustí, and Moro the year 2000).

See also 
 Valencian pilota
 Raspall
 Raspall team championship

External links 
 XXI Campionat Individual de Raspall

1986 establishments in Spain
Valencian pilota competitions
Valencian pilota professional leagues